Gernot Endemann (24 June 1942 – 29 June 2020) was a German film and television actor. He was at one time married to the French actress Jocelyne Boisseau.

Filmography

References

Bibliography
 Ottoson, Robert. American International Pictures: A Filmography. Garland, 1985.

External links

1942 births
2020 deaths
German male film actors
German male television actors
Actors from Essen